99th Street station can refer to:
 99th Street station (IRT Second Avenue Line), a defunct New York City Subway station
 99th Street station (IRT Third Avenue Line), a defunct New York City Subway station
 99th Street station (IRT Ninth Avenue Line), a defunct New York City Subway station
 99th Street–Beverly Hills station, a Metra station in Chicago